Light Weight Kernel Threads (LWKT) is a computer science term and from DragonFly BSD in particular. LWKTs differ from normal kernel threads in that they can preempt normal kernel threads. According to Matt Dillon, DragonFlyBSD creator:

See also
Light-weight process
Thread (computing)

Sources 
Matt Dillon's post about the LWKT scheduler

Threads (computing)
DragonFly BSD